N. flavescens may refer to:

 Nataxa flavescens, an Australasian moth
 Neisseria flavescens, a commensal bacterium
 Neoromicia flavescens, a vesper bat
 Nephrotoma flavescens, a crane fly
 Nerina flavescens, a calyptrate muscoid
 Nerita flavescens, a sea snail
 Nigma flavescens, an araneomorph spider
 Nisueta flavescens, a huntsman spider
 Nola flavescens, a tuft moth
 Nomada flavescens, a cuckoo bee